Olivia Anna Livki (born Olivia Anna Schnitzler; 2 April 1988), also known as LiVKi, is a German singer-songwriter, multi-instrumentalist, arranger and filmmaker currently living in Berlin.

Life and education
Olivia Anna Schnitzler was born on 2 April 1988 in Opole, Poland and raised in Black Forest, South Germany. Olivia graduated from Gymnasium am Hoptbühl, VS in 2004. She went on to study Film Studies, English Philology and Comparative Literature at Freie Universität Berlin, which she finished with Bachelor of Arts in 2008. On April 7, 2018, she announced on Facebook, that she also earned her Master´s Degree in Film Studies. One year later, she also announced that she finished an education as a film and video editor  in Berlin.
From early childhood, Olivia showed a great interest in art and literature, yet especially music and motion picture.

At age 16, she made a Holocaust-shortfilm based on Janusz Korczak's "Ghetto Diaries", called Unbetitelt (which won her several festival-appearances and awards ).

Musical career 
In 2009, Olivia began her career as a professional musician. She released her demo The Smiling Face of Progress  and made two internet-videos: Tennis Rackets (from Girl vs. City) and Hologram (stop motion-animation-video). In order to fund the financing of her debut-album, she took part in a music talent-show on Polish television in 2011. Her appearance caused a hype and frenzy on the internet and throughout the media, with journalists and audiences often referring to her as a musical "epiphany". Her videos Tennis Rackets and Hologram, as well as live-videos were watched altogether more than 300.000 times. A 2014-video-re-upload of her TV-performance of Tel Aviv (originally from 2011) generated more than 130.000 clicks. Demo-versions of songs were shared by fans on myspace and youtube.

In November 2011, the 9 track-concept-album The Name Of This Girl Is was released. It was written, arranged and produced by Livki and mixed by Patrick Dillett and Ron Allaire. On the album and its artwork, Olivia also collaborated with Scottisch drummer Robin Thomson and graphic novelist Iain Sommerville.

Livki designed the artwork (containing drawings by Sommerville) which shows characters from her songs, but also quotes movies, TV shows and themes of modern lifestyle and pop culture. The album was released on her own label L I V V and sold through her internet-shop. It was critically well received. Journalist Karolina Korwin-Piotrowska praises the artist and The Name of This Girl Is  in her book Bomba. Alfabet polskiego szolbiznesu ( The facto 2013 ) . On the day of the album's release, Livki opened for Lenny Kravitz in Torwar, Warsaw.

Livki earned herself the reputation of a celebrated, powerful live-act  and performed at numerous festivals in Berlin, Tokyo, Prague as well as OFF Festival 2011/2015, Reeperbahn Festival 2014 and Coke Live Music Festival 2011.

In July 2012, Olivia signed a license-contract with EMI Music in Poland. In September 2012, The Name Of This Girl Is was re-released as Extended Edition with 3 bonus tracks, and appeared in physical stores, accompanied by a promotional campaign. Its singles Abby Abby (Choir Girl Remix) and Blood Ponies became Youtube-hits, with Abby Abby´s music video earning almost half a million clicks. Livki ´s song Tennis Rackets was also featured on the original soundtrack album and score of feature film Big Love (2012 ).

In 2014, Livki collaborated with Producer Sterling Fox on her single Dark Blonde Rises, which was released under her second artist-pseudonym LiVKi on Fox´s US-indie label Silver Scream Records 

In 2015, Livki released her second album Strangelivv   followed by an EP called I Am Carthago Pt.1. Its single Noke was featured  on Berlin Music Commissions´s Listen to Berlin-Compilation 2016/17.

In late 2019, Listen to Berlin 2019/20 gave a preview of her new music, by including her single Spectacular on the compilation. The single and music video will be officially released on February 20 and 24. In February 2020, Livki announced the release of her new single and album this years. Her third album Digital Dissidents will be released in March 2020.

Discography

Albums
 The Name Of This Girl Is (L I V V, 2011)
 The Name Of This Girl Is - Extended (EMI, 2012)
 Strangelivv (LIVV, Warner Music 2015)
EP: I Am Carthago Pt. 1 (LIVV, 2016)
Digital Dissidents (LIVV, 2020)

Singles
 Tel Aviv (L I V V, 2011)
 Tennis Rackets / Song For The TV (L I V V, 2011)
 Abby Abby! (Choir Girl Remix) (EMI, 2012)
 Earth Moves (EMI, 2013)
 Blood Ponies (Parlophone / L I V V, 2013)
 Dark Blonde Rises (Silver Scream Records, 2014)
 Geek Power (Warner Music, 2015)
Subways (Warner Music, 2015)
Noke (LIVV, 2016)
Spectacular (LIVV, 2020)

Music videos
 Hologram (2009)
 Tennis Rackets (2009)
 Abby Abby! (Choir Girl Remix) (2012)
 Earth Moves (2013)
 Blood Ponies (2013)
 Geek Power (2015)
Noke (2016)
Spectacular (2020)

Compilations 

 Big Love OST (EMI, 2012). 
 Listen to Berlin 2016/17 (BMC 2016)
 Listen to Berlin 2019/20 (BMC 2019)

Literature 
Korwin-Piotrowska, Karolina, Bomba: Alfabet polskiego sholbiznesu, The Facto, Warsaw 2013)

References

External links
 
Official Facebook profile
http://www.youtube.com/user/OliviaAnnaLivkiVEVO
http://soundcloud.com/livki
http://instagram.com/oalivki

Living people
German women singer-songwriters
Polish emigrants to Germany
Indie pop musicians
Film people from Baden-Württemberg
1988 births
21st-century German women singers